Jamal Perry (born Jomal Wiltz; October 23, 1994) is an American football cornerback who is a free agent. He played college football at Iowa State.

High school
In high school, Perry was a standout competitor in both football and track & field. In football, he was named to the second-team all-district team in 21-5A. At the 2013 state track & field meet, Wiltz placed third in the long jump and eighth in the 100 meter dash.

College career

Trinity Valley Community College
Following high school, Perry continued his football career at Trinity Valley Community College in Athens, Texas. In his two seasons, they finished 10-2 and was ranked fifth in 2013 and 12-0 and ranked second in 2014. His second season he finished the year with 79 tackles, three tackles for a loss, one interception, and 14 passes defended, earning first-team all SWJCFC honors.

Iowa State
After his two years at Trinity Valley, Perry chose to attend Iowa State after getting interest from California, Tulsa, and UNLV. He was ranked the eighth-best corner in junior college during that recruiting cycle by ESPN.

In his first season at ISU, he played in all 12 games and started seven of them. He made 41 tackles, in addition to averaging 22.6 yards on kick returns. His season-bests were six solo tackles against Texas Tech and three tackles with two pass breakups against West Virginia.

In 2016 he started 11 of the 12 games and tied the team lead for interceptions with two. In addition, he recorded 49 tackles, two for a loss, and ranked seventh in the Big 12 with 11 pass breakups. Perry's season highlights were eight tackles against UNI, seven tackles against Oklahoma, and a game-sealing interception against Kansas.

At the conclusion of the season he earned the Al and Dean Knudson Award as the team's best defensive player and was named honorable mention All-Big 12. In addition he was invited to compete in the College Gridiron Showcase.

College statistics

Professional career

Philadelphia Eagles
Perry signed with the Philadelphia Eagles as an undrafted free agent on May 11, 2017. He was waived on September 2, 2017.

New England Patriots
On September 7, 2017, Perry was signed to the New England Patriots' practice squad. He was released by the Patriots on September 20, 2017 but was re-signed five days later. He signed a reserve/future contract with the Patriots on February 6, 2018.

On September 1, 2018, Perry was waived by the Patriots and was signed to the practice squad the next day. Perry won Super Bowl LIII when the Patriots beat the Los Angeles Rams 13-3.

Miami Dolphins
On February 15, 2019, Perry signed with the Miami Dolphins. He started his first NFL game in week 1 of 2019 against the Baltimore Ravens and recorded his first tackle. In week 9 against the New York Jets, Perry recorded his first career interception off Sam Darnold in the 26–18 win.

Perry was placed on the reserve/COVID-19 list by the Dolphins on December 9, 2020, and activated on December 18.

Perry was given an exclusive-rights free agent tender by the Dolphins on March 8, 2021. He signed the one-year contract on April 14. He was waived on September 1, 2021 and re-signed to the practice squad. He was promoted to the active roster on November 17. He was placed on injured reserve on November 23.

On October 25, 2022, Perry was signed to the Miami Dolphins practice squad.

Personal
Perry legally changed his name from Jomal Wiltz to Jamal Perry in March 2020.

References

External links
Miami Dolphins bio
Iowa State Cyclones bio

1994 births
Living people
African-American players of American football
American football cornerbacks
Iowa State Cyclones football players
Miami Dolphins players
New England Patriots players
Philadelphia Eagles players
Players of American football from Texas
Sportspeople from Harris County, Texas
21st-century African-American sportspeople